Okarche is a town in Canadian and Kingfisher counties in Oklahoma, United States, that is part of the Oklahoma City Metropolitan Area. The population was 1,215 at the 2010 census, a 9.5 percent increase from 1,110 at the 2000 census.

History
Okarche is located on land that, before 1830, was within the historic area of the Wichita people. The location was in territory assigned to the Creek and Seminole people when removal of tribes from the southeastern United States began in 1830. After the Civil War, parts of Indian Territory were designated for resettlement of Plains Indians. The site of the future town of Okarche was just inside the eastern border of the Cheyenne and Arapaho reservation.

From 1867 to 1884, cattle were driven through the area on the Chisholm Trail from Texas to railheads in Kansas. Later the Chicago, Rock Island and Pacific Railroad and the state road which would become the Meridian Highway and U.S. Highway 81 would follow roughly the same route through Oklahoma Territory.

On March 2, 1887, the U.S. Congress approved construction of a railroad through Indian Territory. The Chicago, Kansas and Nebraska Railway was given a  right of way through the territory and authorized to take additional right of way for stations every  of track. Railway assets would be turned over to the CRI&P in June 1890. Construction proceeded southward from Caldwell, Kansas, and was completed to Pond Creek by April 1889 and to El Reno in January 1890. The railway depot where Okarche was platted was completed at that time.

The Okarche post office was established June 28, 1890. Cheyenne and Arapaho lands were opened to settlement by land run on April 19, 1892. The town was incorporated in 1905 – two years before statehood. The name of the town is derived from parts of three words, Oklahoma (OK), Arapaho (AR), and Cheyenne (CHE). The Southern Arapaho and Cheyenne Native American tribes had been relocated to Oklahoma from the northern Great Plains in the late 19th century. The town's population hovered in the 400s for more than three decades after statehood had risen to over 1,200 by 2010.

By the late 1890s, German immigrants were a greater part of the population and German a widely used language of the community. Many had come to America in the wave of 1.5 million German immigrants to the United States in the 1880s and lived in states to the north such as Iowa, Nebraska, or Missouri before coming to Oklahoma Territory. Catholic and Lutheran churches with schools were established as immigrants sought to keep faith and customs from the old country alive in their new home. St. John's Lutheran Church was founded in 1892 and Holy Trinity Catholic Church in 1893. Worship and education was conducted principally in German until American entry into World War I in 1917. Bilingual worship would continue for about two decades.

When federal highway numbering was implemented in November 1926, the Meridian Highway through Okarche was designated US-81 and fully paved in the Okarche area by 1931. The Northwest Highway (OK-3) was opened as a gravel-surfaced road in 1939 and fully paved by 1947. Okarche now has four-lane divided highway access to neighboring communities, including the Oklahoma City metro area. The Chicago, Rock Island and Pacific Railroad entered its final bankruptcy in 1975. The Union Pacific Railroad now operates on the former Rock Island route.

Geography
Okarche is located on the boundary of Kingfisher and Canadian counties. Oklahoma State Highway 3 leads southeast  to Oklahoma City.

Demographics

As of the census of 2010, there were 1,215 people, 468 households, and 321 families residing in the town. There were 496 housing units. The racial makeup of the town was 92.8% White, 0.6% African American, 2.3% Native American, 0.0% Asian, 2.3% from other races, and 2.0% from two or more races. Hispanic or Latino of any race were 5.4% of the population.

Of the 468 households, 28.2% had children under the age of 18 living with them, 57.3% were married couples living together, 8.1% had a female householder with no husband present, and 31.4% were non-families. 29.3% of all households were made up of individuals, and 15.0% had someone living alone who was 65 years of age or older. The average household size was 2.40 and the average family size was 2.99.

In the town, the population was spread out, with 22.9% under the age of 18, 5.9% from 18 to 24, 24.9% from 25 to 44, 28.7% from 45 to 64, and 17.6% who were 65 years of age or older. The median age was 41.8 years. For every 100 females, there were 93.2 males. For every 100 females age 18 and over, there were 86.3 males.

According to the 2013 American Community Survey, the median income for a household in the town was $54,688, and the median income for a family was $76,250. Males had a median income of $50,682 versus $31,250 for females. The per capita income for the town was $32,547. About 6.1% of families and 15.3% of the population were below the poverty line, including 13.7% of those under age 18 and 6.5% of those age 65 or over.

Economy
The town is best known for Eischen's Bar, which claims to be "the oldest bar" in the state of Oklahoma and famous for its secret recipe fried chicken. In 2009, Food Network's program, Guy Fieri's Diners, Drive-Ins and Dives, visited Eischen's, and the bar was featured on the television show.

Major employers include Nortek, formerly Temtrol, a manufacturer of air handling units, coils and fans; and OEM Systems, a firm specializing in custom fitting commercial vehicles and fuel conversion of vehicles to compressed natural gas.

Notable people
 Daniel Henry Mueggenborg, Roman Catholic bishop
 Stanley Rother, martyred Roman Catholic priest and candidate for sainthood
 Chris Schroder, right-handed pitcher for the Washington Nationals

See also

 List of cities and towns in Oklahoma

References

External links

Oklahoma City metropolitan area 
Towns in Canadian County, Oklahoma
Towns in Kingfisher County, Oklahoma
Towns in Oklahoma
Populated places established in 1890
1890 establishments in Oklahoma Territory